Paseo Academy, also referred to as Paseo Academy of Fine and Performing Arts and sometimes Paseo High School, is a magnet performing arts high school located at 4747 Flora Avenue in Kansas City, Missouri. It is part of the Kansas City Public Schools.

Background
Paseo Academy is named for Paseo Boulevard, a main street in Kansas City, which is one block west of the school. The school sits on top of a hill with the Kansas City Middle School of the Arts behind it. The old Paseo High School building, designed by Charles A. Smith in 1924 and completed on September 9, 1926, was slated for demolition in 1990. It was not a performing arts school until the current building was built.

Paseo Academy was formerly Paseo High School, which served the Blue Hills neighborhood.

During the 1960s, Paseo High School experienced rapid "white flight" and had a predominantly African American student body in the 1970s.

Audition requirements
Students are required to pass an audition to be enrolled. They can pick up an audition packet from the school or from the Admissions Office at 1211 McGee in Downtown Kansas City.

Notable alumni

Jeff Cook, former Major League Baseball player-Pittsburgh Pirates, St.Louis Cardinals (1985-1998)
Brian Kennedy, music producer
Dick Kenworthy, former MLB player
Lil' Ronnie, music producer
Robert Long, admiral
Robert Lowery, actor
Angyil McNeal, born Angela McNeal, world champion hip-hop dancer
Harold O'Neal, music composer
Anthony Peeler, former NBA player
Nick Schnebelen, blues rock musician
Craig Stevens, born Gail Shikles, actor who portrayed Peter Gunn

References

External links
 School website
 Paseo High School alumni

High schools in Kansas City, Missouri
Magnet schools in Missouri
Schools in Jackson County, Missouri
Public high schools in Missouri
Public middle schools in Missouri